Two-(Re)Mix (stylized as TWO→(RE)MIX) is the first remix album by J-pop duo Two-Mix, released by King Records on March 23, 1996. It features remixes of the Mobile Suit Gundam Wing opening themes "Just Communication" and "Rhythm Emotion".

The album peaked at No. 15 on Oricon's weekly albums chart.

Track listing 
All lyrics are written by Shiina Nagano; all music is arranged by Two-Mix.

Charts

References

External links 
 
 

1996 remix albums
Two-Mix albums
Japanese-language compilation albums
King Records (Japan) compilation albums